Cook Off! is a 2007 American mockumentary comedy film directed by Cathryn Michon and Guy Shalem. The film was released on November 17, 2017, after being shelved for 10 years.

Synopsis
A group of quirky people is  competing in a famed cooking contest for the grand prize of one million dollars.

Cast

Production
The film was already finished by 2007, but was shelved without explanation for a decade. In September 2017, Lionsgate Premiere reportedly was to finally release the film. Lionsgate had reportedly edited the film prior to release by cutting 20 minutes of footage and adding 22 minutes of previously unused footage.

Release
The film made its worldwide premiere at the US Comedy Arts Festival in Aspen, Colorado, in February 2007. The film was released in theaters and on VOD on November 17, 2017.

Reception
On review aggregation website Rotten Tomatoes, the film has an average rating of 25% based on eight reviews, with an average rating of 6.20/10.

John DeFore of The Hollywood Reporter writes, "Cook Off! piles some better-than-this comedians into a culinary competition whose dishes look as unpalatable as the film itself." Ben Kenigsberg of The New York Times writes: "The movie tries to do for amateur cooking contests what Best in Show did for dog competitions, but the strained folksiness and tired stereotypes couldn’t be further from the snap and wit of prime Christopher Guest. Michael Rechtshaffen of the Los Angeles Times writes, "Wafting into theaters after sitting on the back burner for the last decade, Cook Off! is a shrill, gloppy mess of a mockumentary being served up well past its "best before" date — if there ever actually were one."

References

External links

2007 films
2007 comedy films
American mockumentary films
Cooking films
Films about food and drink
Lionsgate films
2000s English-language films
2000s American films